If The Beatles Had Read Hunter...The Singles (1994) is a singles compilation released after The Wonder Stuff's original demise in 1994, which reached number 8 on the UK album charts.

The title referred to a quote (that) “if the writer Hunter S. Thompson had been a presiding influence over The Beatles, then they might have looked and sounded like The Wonder Stuff".

Track listing

 "Welcome to the Cheap Seats" (2:36)
 "A Wish Away" (2:30)
 "Caught in My Shadow" (3:34)
 "Don't Let Me Down, Gently" (3:02)
 "The Size of a Cow" (3:13)
 "Hot Love Now!" (3:13)
 "Dizzy" (Tommy Roe/Freddy Weller) (3:19) (Credited to Vic Reeves and The Wonder Stuff)
 "Unbearable" (2:26)
 "Circlesquare" (3:22)
 "Who Wants to Be the Disco King?" (2:49)
 "Golden Green" (3:02)
 "Give, Give, Give Me More, More, More" (2:49)
 "'Coz I Luv You" (Noddy Holder/Jim Lea) (3:29) (A cover of the band Slade's 1971 single)
 "Sleep Alone" (3:35)
 "Full of Life (Happy Now)" (3:34)
 "It's Yer Money I'm After, Baby" (2:48)
 "On the Ropes" (3:54)
 "It's Not True" (1:58)

References 

Allmusic review

The Wonder Stuff albums
1994 compilation albums
Polydor Records compilation albums